Specials was a part-time satellite radio channel which plays select special events and shows for Sirius and XM. When the channel was XM Live, some special events were broadcast in XM HD Surround, which was a 5.1 surround sound audio/CD quality stereo feed. XM Live broadcast musical events, concerts, sporting events, and weekly talk shows. The channel is available to XM Satellite Radio customers on Channel 120,
And to Sirius Satellite Radio customers on Channel 113.

History

When Specials first began on XM as XM Live, it was part of the hits section on XM26 (The Pulse now sits there). Its original purpose was to play live musical events (live as in on-stage, since most were recorded). Special events at the time were a part of Special X. On September 14, 2002, XM Live was moved to channel 168, where its format stayed the same for a couple more years. In 2004, the channel was moved to 200, and the live performances format was dropped so that XM Live could be a multi-purpose special events channel. The channel would play select sporting events, concerts, and some of XM's exclusive series such as Artist Confidential and Then...Again...Live!. In 2005, XM Live was doubled into 2 channels (the other on XM201) for the Live 8 multi-cast on XM. Since early 2006, XM Live has not played the Artist Confidential or Then...Again...Live! series', instead leaving those for the music channels in which they simulcast on. XM Live has also opened itself up to exclusive talk show programming, starting with 60/20 Sports with James Carville and Luke Russert. In July 2006, XM Live began airing The Agenda with Joe Solmonese. The Agenda currently streams through XM Radio Online channel 137

In April 2007, XM Live moved to XM channel 120 to make more room for XM's college play-by-play channels. Big East Conference games had been broadcast by channel previously.

Since its move the channel has been more focused on niche programming, such as special weekends of music devoted to a specific theme, usually coinciding with a holiday i.e. Labor Day (songs relating to cars), 4 July (music with a patriotic theme). While special events have all but moved to music channels, or to XMX. The channel also occasionally broadcast news events, or programming relating to it.

On September 30, 2008, XM Live was deleted from the XM lineup. XMX handled most of XM's special event programming. XM has not indicated whether or not they would continue their micro-channels.

On November 12, 2008 XM Live Returned to the lineup as Specials. The channel was also added to Sirius (SR 113) following the XM/Sirius Merger. Also, XMX was dropped from the XM lineup.

List of shows and events Specials had broadcast when it was XM Live
2004 National Radio Hall of Fame induction ceremony with Bob Edwards
Vote For Change Concert
Indianapolis 500
An Evening of Restoration: Music City Comes Together for Tsunami Relief
FIFA World Cup Germany 2006 Soccer team draw
Coverage of the death of Pope John Paul II and the naming of Pope Benedict XVI
Live 8
From Be Bop To Hip Hop
US Open
XM Nation: Operation Helping Hand Live Broadcast
20th Anniversary Farm Aid Concert
Mozart 250th Commemoration Concert in Salzburg
2006 & 2007 Grammy Awards
Rock in Rio
60/20 Sports (moved to XM Sports Nation)
Artist Confidential Series (moved to music channels)
Then...Again...Live! Series (moved to music channels)
Before the Music Dies documentary 
XM/Sirius merger investor phone conference
XM Green: Radio Ireland 
Big East conference games (moved to channel 203)
 Play Ball! 
 Virginia Tech massacre local radio relay of WFIR, WXLK and WSLQ.
 Memory Almost Full: Paul McCartney's New CD
XM Summer 
Fade...To...Black
Uncle Sam 
 Christmas in July 
2007-08-08 Endeavor Space Shuttle Launch
Car-B-Q 
2007 U.S. Open
Igor
Mardi Gras
Christmas Mass in Rome
Party City
Pope Benedict XVI in America
The Agenda

References

External links

XM Satellite Radio channels
Digital-only radio stations
Radio stations established in 2008
Defunct radio stations in the United States